Henry Holle was a member of the Wisconsin State Assembly.

Biography
Holle was born on October 12, 1859, in Milwaukee, Wisconsin. In 1890, he became a deputy sheriff of Milwaukee County, Wisconsin. He became Undersheriff in 1892.

Assembly career
Holle was elected to the Assembly in 1904. He was a Republican.

References

Politicians from Milwaukee
Republican Party members of the Wisconsin State Assembly
American deputy sheriffs
1859 births
Year of death missing